African Sources for African History is a book series published by Brill that aims to make available critical editions of indigenous African narrative sources from sub-Saharan Africa. The series aims to expand the sources available to historians of Africa, and to rectify bias that may have been introduced into the writing of African history through an over-reliance on sources written by Europeans.

The first in the series was the 2001 Somono Bala of the Upper Niger, an epic story of fishing people, translated into English from the Maninka language for the first time.

Titles in series
 The Epic of Sumanguru Kante
 Les mémoires de Maalaŋ Galisa sur le royaume confédéré du Kaabu
 Guidance (Uwongozi) by Sheikh al-Amin Mazrui: Selections from the First Swahili Islamic Newspaper
 Print Culture and the First Yoruba Novel
 Sukuma Labor Songs from Western Tanzania
 Writing for Kenya
 Tarikh Mandinka de Bijini (Guinée-Bissau)
 Entretiens avec Bala Kanté
 The Pen-Pictures of Modern Africans and African Celebrities by Charles Francis Hutchison
 Servants of the Sharia
 Djinns, Stars and Warriors
 Telling Our Own Stories
 Les Rois des Tambours au Haayre
 Marita: or the Folly of Love
 Somono Bala of the Upper Niger

References

Historiography of Africa
African literature
Monographic series
Publications established in 2001